Big Moose Community Chapel is a historic chapel located on Big Moose Lake near Eagle Bay in Herkimer County, New York. The chapel was built in 1931, and is a modified "L"-plan Late Gothic Revival style church constructed of locally quarried granite. It has a cross-gable roof and features a small square belfry and pointed arch openings. It was built by master builder Earl Covey and incorporates Adirondack style architectural elements.

The chapel was listed on the National Register of Historic Places in 2012.

References

Properties of religious function on the National Register of Historic Places in New York (state)
Churches completed in 1931
Gothic Revival architecture in New York (state)
Churches in Herkimer County, New York
National Register of Historic Places in Herkimer County, New York